Tritia conspersa is a species of sea snail, a marine gastropod mollusk in the family Nassariidae, the Nassa mud snails or dog whelks.

Description
The length of the shell varies between 10 mm and 15 mm.

Distribution
This species occurs in the Atlantic Ocean off the Canary Islands.

References

 Cernohorsky W. O. (1984). Systematics of the family Nassariidae (Mollusca: Gastropoda). Bulletin of the Auckland Institute and Museum 14: 1–356.
 Segers W., Rolan E. & Swinnen F. (2008) Study and separation of two species treated as Nassarius pfeifferi (Philippi, 1844) (Neogastropoda, Nassariidae). Visaya 2(3): 18–28.

External links
 

conspersa
Gastropods described in 1848
Taxa named by Rodolfo Amando Philippi